"High and Dry" and "Planet Telex" are songs by the English rock band Radiohead. They were released as a double-A side single from their second studio album, The Bends (1995), on 5 March 1995.

"High and Dry" was recorded as a demo during the sessions of Radiohead's first album, Pablo Honey (1993), and remastered for inclusion on The Bends.  "Planet Telex" developed from studio experimentation with drum loops. Two music videos were produced for "High and Dry".

Recording
The Radiohead songwriter, Thom Yorke, performed an early version of "High and Dry" with the band Headless Chickens while he was a student at the University of Exeter in the late 1980s. He said the lyrics were about "some loony girl I was going out with", but became "mixed up with ideas about success and failure". In 1993, Radiohead recorded a demo version with their live engineer, Jim Warren, but dismissed it as "too Rod Stewart". The demo was rediscovered and remastered for inclusion on their second album, The Bends (1995). In 2006, Yorke said that Radiohead's record label, EMI, had pressured him to release it and that it was a "very bad" song.

Radiohead wrote and recorded "Planet Telex" in a single session at RAK Studios while working on The Bends. It developed from experiments with a drum loop taken from another song, the B-side "Killer Cars", to which Radiohead added piano processed with multiple delay effects. The band had recently returned from a restaurant, and Yorke recorded the vocals drunk, slumped in a corner. According to the producer, John Leckie, "We had the whole thing down within a couple of hours, which was really refreshing and fun to do." The original title was "Planet Xerox", but Radiohead were denied permission to use the Xerox trademark.

Legacy 
Pitchfork credited Bends songs as such as "High and Dry" and "Fake Plastic Trees" for anticipating the "airbrushed" post-Britpop of Coldplay and Travis. The Irish Times said that "High and Dry" had "essentially invented Coldplay".

Music videos
Two music videos were created for "High and Dry": one for the British market, featuring Radiohead in a California desert, and one for the USA, set in a diner. Only the US version appears on the band's 1998 video compilation 7 Television Commercials. Both appear on the Radiohead: The Best Of DVD, released in 2008 by EMI.

Track listing

Personnel

Radiohead
 Colin Greenwood
 Jonny Greenwood
 Ed O'Brien
 Philip Selway
 Thom Yorke

Production
John Leckie – production (except "High and Dry"), mixing ("Maquiladora")
Nigel Godrich – engineering (except "High and Dry")
Steve Osborne – remixing ("Planet Telex (Hexidecimal Mix)")
Chris Brown – engineering ("Maquiladora")
Sean Slade and Paul Q. Kolderie – mixing ("Planet Telex", "High and Dry", "Killer Cars")

Artwork
 Stanley Donwood
 Thom Yorke

Charts

Weekly charts

Year-end charts

Certifications

References

External links
 

Radiohead songs
1995 singles
Parlophone singles
Capitol Records singles
Songs written by Thom Yorke
Songs written by Colin Greenwood
Songs written by Jonny Greenwood
Songs written by Philip Selway
Songs written by Ed O'Brien
Song recordings produced by John Leckie
Black-and-white music videos